Miteh (also Romanized as Mīteh) is a village in Kabgan Rural District, Kaki District, Dashti County, Bushehr Province, Iran. At the 2006 census, its population was 71, in 12 families.

References 

Populated places in Dashti County